The Premier Mine is an underground diamond mine owned by Petra Diamonds in the town of Cullinan,  east of Pretoria, Gauteng Province, South Africa. Established in 1902, it was renamed the Cullinan Diamond Mine in November 2003 in celebration of its centenary. The mine rose to prominence in 1905, when the Cullinan Diamond – the largest rough diamond of gem quality ever found – was discovered there.

It is also the only significant source of blue diamonds in the world.

Notable discoveries 
It was found by Frederick Wells, surface manager of the Premier Diamond Mining Company in Cullinan, Gauteng, South Africa, on 25 January 1905. The stone was named after Sir Thomas Cullinan, the owner of the diamond mine.

There have been various other notable diamonds that have been recovered from Premier Mine. These include:
 The Premier Rose –  rough
 The Niarchos –  rough
 The De Beers Centenary –  rough
 Golden Jubilee Diamond –  rough
 Taylor-Burton Diamond –  polished

In May 2008, a sparkling shield-shaped  diamond (about the size of a ping pong ball) mined from the Premier Mine sold for more than US$6.2 million at Christie's in Hong Kong. Cut from a  rough, the shield-shaped gem boasts 92 brilliant facets. While internally flawless, the stone has a slight imperfection on the surface that is imperceptible to the human eye, the auction house said. It is the largest colourless diamond to appear on the auction market in the last 18 years, Christie's said. Only three diamonds of more than  have appeared at auction. All were sold in Geneva. Naming rights were granted to the new owner.

In September 2009, a  diamond was found, and is ranked as one of the 20 biggest high quality diamonds ever discovered. Petra Diamonds sold it for $35.3 million on 26 February 2010, breaking a record as the highest price ever paid for a rough diamond.

On 18 April 2013 a  blue rough diamond was recovered by Petra Diamonds at its Cullinan mine. According to experts it could be worth more than $10m. The find gave a boost to Petra's share price. The mine has produced hundreds of large stones and is famed for its production of blue diamonds. A similar  blue rough diamond recovered by Petra in May 2009 was cut into a near perfect stone and fetched just under $10m at Sotheby's. Another deep-blue diamond from Cullinan was auctioned for $10.8m last year and set a world record for the value per carat.

On 21 January 2014, Petra Diamonds announced recovery of a  blue diamond. According to the current CEO, Johan Dippenaar, it is the "most significant blue diamond" to be recovered by Petra Diamonds. According to Analyst Cailey Barker at broker Numis it "could fetch between $15m and $20m at auction". Decision on what is to be done with the stone will come next week.

The diamond, though not yet appraised, is expected to fetch more than 35 million dollars, which was the approximate value of the Heritage Diamond, also found in that mine. Petra Diamonds says that the diamond will not be put up for auction before their fiscal year ends this month.

Purchase by Petra Diamonds 

On 22 November 2007, De Beers, the world's largest diamond producer, announced that it had entered into an agreement to sell the Cullinan mine for R1 billion (US$125 million) to Petra Diamonds Cullinan Consortium (PDCC), a consortium of:
 Petra Diamonds 37% stake, with an option to increase to 60%
 Al Rajhi Holdings W.L.L. 37% stake
 A Black Economic Empowerment foundation 26% stake, comprising a 12% stake held by an employee share trust and a 14% stake held by Thembinkosi Mining Investments (Pty) Ltd
On 16 July 2008, Petra announced the completion of the acquisition.

References

Further reading 
 Diamond Mines of South Africa, Premier Diamond mine overview + images by A.R.Williams former general manager of De Beers (900-page overview).
 De Beers sells South African Cullinan Diamond Mine (dead link 30 March 2019)

External links 

 

Diamond mines in South Africa
Underground mines in South Africa
Economy of Gauteng
Geography of Gauteng
City of Tshwane Metropolitan Municipality